His Highness' Ship Glasgow was a royal yacht belonging to the Sultan of Zanzibar.  She was built in the style of the British frigate  which had visited the Sultan in 1873. Glasgow cost the Sultan £32,735 and contained several luxury features but failed to impress the Sultan and she lay at anchor in harbour at Zanzibar Town for much of her career.  The vessel was brought out of semi-retirement on 25 August 1896 when she participated in the Anglo-Zanzibar War and was soon sunk by a flotilla of British warships.  Glasgows wreck remained in the harbour, her three masts and funnel projecting from the water, until 1912 when she was broken up for scrap.

Construction 

Glasgow was built in 1878 as a replacement for Sultan Bargash's fleet which had been lost in a hurricane in 1872. Glasgow was based upon the British Royal Navy screw frigate  which had impressed the Sultan during a visit to Zanzibar in 1873.  Bargash consulted with Sir William Mackinnon, the founder of the British-India Steam Navigation Company, who recommended the firm of William Denny and Brothers as shipbuilders.  On 17 April 1877 Denny wrote to Bargash's agents promising to build "a vessel in every way a handsome and substantial piece of work" and on 14 May 1877 the ship was laid down. The vessel was constructed with an iron frame covered with teak planks and a keel made from rock elm, the hull was sheathed with Muntz metal below the waterline. Glasgow was equipped with three masts and a steam propulsion system with a lifting propeller. The vessel was launched on 2 March 1878.

Glasgow was well fitted out for its role as a royal yacht and contained two state rooms, a dining saloon, a bathroom and a water closet for use by the Sultan. In all, the vessel cost £32,735 and was fitted out with seven rifled, muzzle-loading nine-pounder cannon and a nine-barrelled Gatling gun, courtesy of Queen Victoria. It set sail for Zanzibar from Portsmouth on 17 April 1878 under the command of Captain Hand of the Royal Navy.  Upon arrival in Zanzibar Town, the Sultan inspected his new purchase and was rumoured to be unimpressed, Glasgow being rather less imposing than its namesake, the British frigate.  The ship lay at anchor in harbour through the rest of the Sultan's reign and that of his three successors until 1896.

Anglo-Zanzibar War 

On 25 August 1896 a new Sultan, Khalid, ascended to the sultancy without first consulting the British authorities, as required by treaty. This sparked the Anglo-Zanzibar War. On 27 August the now obsolete Glasgow, the sole vessel of the Zanzibar Navy, fired upon a flotilla of five British ships, led by the cruiser  with its  guns.  In return Glasgow was holed below her waterline and began sinking. Her crew hoisted the British flag as a token of surrender and all were rescued by British sailors in launches. The ship eventually sank at 10:45 am that day, settling on the harbour bed with just its masts and funnel projecting from the water.

Glasgow remained there until an unstable mast prompted the harbour master and the Zanzibar government to consider raising her. Eventually, in 1912, a salvage company was awarded a £2,500 contract and she was broken up with explosive charges over a period of six months.  The debris was disposed of at sea, her boiler, propeller and several cannon being sold for scrap.  Several sections of iron frames remain intact on the harbour bed together with teak planks, sheets of Muntz metal, iron ballast blocks and the remains of the steam engine and propeller shaft.  The site is occasionally visited by sports divers.

References

Bibliography 
.
.

External links
 

History of Zanzibar
Victorian-era ships
Ships built on the River Clyde
Royal and presidential yachts
1878 ships
Steam yachts
Maritime incidents in 1896
Shipwrecks of Africa
Shipwrecks in the Indian Ocean
1878 establishments in Scotland
Dumbarton